Wheelchair basketball at the 1996 Summer Paralympics consisted of men's and women's team events.

Medal summary 

Source: Paralympic.org

See also
Basketball at the 1996 Summer Olympics

References 

 

 
1996 Summer Paralympics events
1996
Paralympics